

Discography

1970's

1980's

1990's

2000's

2010's

2020's

Upcoming projects 
The below list gives the upcoming/announced films composed by Ilaiyaraaja.

Albums (instrumental, non-film)

Television
 1991 Penn
 2008 Namma Kudumbam 
 2008 Thekkathi Ponnu

Books
Sangeethakkanavukal
Yaarukku Yaar Ezhudhuvadhu
Paal Nilaa Paadhai
Enaku Ethuvo Unakum Athuve

Ad jingles
Hindustan Coca-Cola collaborated with Ilaiyaraaja for its ad jingles. This is the first time Raja has done a commercial jingle.

 Idea Cellular (used "Naguva nayana" Kannada song from Pallavi Anupallavi)
 Malabar Gold and Diamonds

Many of Ilaiyaraaja's songs were used as jingles in advertisements. Filmmaker R Balki has used them in many of his ads either as a musical note or a jingle composed to the same tune.

Onscreen appearances

Reused tracks
Agal Vilakku (1978; Tamil) from Maathu Thappida Maga (1979; Kannada) (1 song Bhaanu Bhoomiya reused as Edho Ninaivugal)
Auto Raja (1983; Tamil) from Olangal (1982; Malayalam) (1 song Thumbi Vaa reused as Sangathil Paadatha) Raja later reused Thumbi Vaa as Monday Tho Utkar for the film Aur Ek Prem Kahani and as Gumm Summ Gumm for Hindi film Paa (2009)
Aayiram Nilave Vaa (1983; Tamil) from Geetha (1981; Kannada) (1 song Keladi Nimageega reused as Devathai Ilam Devi)
Unnai Naan Sandhithen (1984; Tamil) from Geetha (1981; Kannada) (1 song Nanna Jeeva reused as Devan Thandha)
Nooravathu Naal (1984; Tamil) from Geetha (1981; Kannada) (1 song Jotheyali reused as Vizhiyile Mani Vizhiyil) Raja later reused Jotheyali as Jaane Do Na for Hindi film Cheeni Kum (2007).
Thambikku Endha Ooru (1985; Tamil) from Sadma (1983; Hindi) (1 song Hey Zindagi reused as En Vaazhvile)
Aur Ek Prem Kahani (1986; Hindi) from Johnny (1980; Tamil) (1 song Kaatril Endhan Geetham reused as Naina Bole)
Varasudochadu (1988; Telugu) from Enga Ooru Paatukaran (Tamil) (1 song Jinjinakku Janakku reused as Jamchakku)
Senbagame Senbagame (1988; Tamil) from Maharshi (1987; Telugu) (1 song Maatarani Mounamidi reused as Manja Podi)
Mahadev (1989; Hindi) from Mudhal Mariyadhai (1985; Tamil) (1 song Andha Nilava reused as Mujhe Baahon)
Enkitta Mothathe (1990; Tamil) from Adharvam (1989; Malayalam) (1 song Puzhoyarathil reused as Sariyo Sariyo)
Jagadeka Veerudu Athiloka Sundari (1990; Telugu) from Enga Ooru Paatukaran (1987; Tamil) (1 song Madurai Marikozhundhu reused as Yamaho Nee Yama)
Aa Okkati Adakku (1993; Telugu) from Enga Ooru Paattukaran (1987; Tamil) (1 song Shenbagame reused as Paavurama)
Preminchedi Endukamma (1999; Telugu) from Kadhalukku Mariyadhai (1997; Tamil) (5 songs Ennai Thaalattu Varuvala reused as Chinni Paadala Chilukamma, Aanantha Kuyilin Paattu reused as Manasu Koila Paata, Oru Pattampoochi  reused as O Sita Koka Chiluka, Oh Baby reused as Oh Baby, Ayya Veedu Therandhuthan reused as Chinthalapudi Chilakara)
Ninu Choodaka Nenundalenu (2002; Telugu) from En Mana Vaanil (2002, Tamil) (1 song Enna Solli reused as Jaaji Malli Thottalona)
Anumanaspadam (2007; Telugu) from Naane Raja Naane Manthiri (1985; Tamil) (1 song Mayanginen Solla Thayanginen reused as Prathidhinam Nee Dharshanam)
Paa (2009; Hindi) from Alaigal Oivathillai (1980; Tamil) (1 song Putham Pudhu Kaalai reused as Halke Se Bole)
Gundello Godari (2013; Telugu) from Johnny (1980; Tamil) (1 song Aasaiya Kaathula reused as Rathri) Raja reused Aasaiye Kaathule as Stereophonic Sannata for Hindi film Shamitabh (2015)
Yevade Subramanyam (2015; Telugu) from Avatharam (1995; Tamil) (1 song Thendral Vanthu reused as Challa Galli)

References

External links
 
 Collection of Ilayaraja songs at Paadal.com
 Collection of Ilayaraja Songs, Videos, Images and BGM

Discographies
Discographies of Indian artists
Discography